Ilia Chavchavadze Avenue is one of the main avenues of Tbilisi and is named after the writer Ilia Chavchavadze. The avenue is located on the right bank of the Kura River in the Vake district of Tbilisi and is a continuation of Melikishvili and Rustaveli Avenue. It was originally, from 1935 to 1957 named Niko Marr Street after the orientalist Nicholas Marr.

Gallery

References

Streets in Tbilisi
Vake, Tbilisi